Governorate council elections were held in Iraq on 30 January 2005, the same day as the elections for the transitional Iraqi National Assembly. Each province has a 41-member council, except for Baghdad, whose council has 51 members.

A summary of the results by governorate was:

Total

National results

Governors

Al Anbar Governorate 

The council elected Maamoon Sami Rasheed al-Alwani as governor.

Babil Governorate 

The council elected Salem al-Saleh Meslmawe as the governor.

Baghdad Governorate 

The council elected SCIRI member, Hussain al-Tahan as governor.

Basra Governorate

The council elected Fadhila member Mohammed al-Waili as governor. In April 2007, SIIC successfully brought a no-confidence motion against Waili. This dismissal was ratified by Prime Minister Nouri al-Maliki in July.

Dhi Qar Governorate 

The council elected Aziz Kadum Alwan al-Ogheli, a SCIRI member, as governor.

Diyala Governorate 

The council elected Ra'ad Hameed Al-Mula Jowad Al-Tamimi, a Badr Brigades leader, as governor.

Source - http://www.washingtoninstitute.org/html/newsletterImages/PF81Annexes.pdf

Karbala Governorate 

The council elected SCIRI member Uqeil al-Khazaali as governor.

Kirkuk Governorate 

The council re-elected Abdulrahman Mustapha Fatah as governor, who had served since the 2003 invasion of Iraq

Maysan Governorate 

Adel Mahudar Radi, a former Mahdi Army commander, was elected governor.

Muthanna Governorate

The Governorate Council elected SCIRI member Mohammed Ali al-Hasani as the provincial Governor, and an Islamic Dawa Party member, Ahmad Marzouq Salal as the council president. al-Hasani was assassinated in August 2007 in an attack blamed on the Mahdi Army, and the council elected Marzouq his successor, with an SCIRI member becoming the council president.

Najaf Governorate 

The council elected SCIRI member Asaad Abu Gilel al-Taie as governor.

Nineveh Governorate

The council voted for the independent Sunni Arab, Duraid Kashmoula, to continue as governor. His brother, Usama Yousif Kashmula, had been appointed as governor of Nineveh Governorate in 2003 by the Coalition Provisional Authority, and Duraid succeeded Usama after he was assassinated in July 2004.

Al-Qādisiyyah Governorate 

The Governorate Council chose SCIRI members Khalil Jalil Hamza as the governor and Sheikh Hamid al-Khodari as council president. Hamza was assassinated in August 2007 in an attack blamed on the Mahdi Army. al-Khodari was elected to replace Hamza as governor.

Saladin Governorate 

The council elected Hamed Hamood Shekti al-Qaisi as governor.

Wasit Governorate 

The council elected Latif Hamid Turfa, a Sadrist, as governor.

Iraqi Kurdistan region

Erbil Governorate 

The council voted for Kurdistan Democratic Party member Nawzad Hadi Mawlood to become governor.

Dohuk Governorate 

The council elected KDP member Tamar Ramadan as governor.

Sulaymaniyah Governorate

The council elected PUK member Dana Ahmed Majid as governor.

References

Governorate elections held in Iraq on 31 January 2005
Parties
Provincial Politics in Iraq - Freagmentation or Awakening? , Washington Institute, 2008-04-01, accessed on 2009-01-12

Elections in Iraq
2005 elections in Iraq
January 2005 events in Iraq